Butterball is a brand of turkey and other poultry products produced by Butterball LLC.

Butterball or Butterballs may also refer to:

Butterball (Emery Schaub), a male Marvel Comics character
Butterball (Vivian Dolan), a female Marvel Comics character
Butterball Cenobite, a character from Clive Barker's Hellraiser franchise
Buttercup (fairy tale) or Butterball, a Norwegian fairy tale
"Butterballs" (South Park), an episode of the TV show South Park
Butterballs, a type of pastry similar to Russian tea cakes
"Butterball", a track from the 1965 album Whipped Cream & Other Delights by Herb Alpert & the Tijuana Brass
Cocksucking Cowboy, an alcoholic drink (shooter) also known as a butterball
Butterball, nickname of Paul Scull (1907-1997), American football player
Butterball, a creek in Bassett Township, St. Louis County, Minnesota, United States

See also
Krishna's Butterball, a gigantic granite boulder resting on a short incline in the historical town of Mahabalipuram in Tamil Nadu, India
Lottie Kimbrough (1900-?), American country blues singer nicknamed the "Kansas City Butterball"
"Boule de Suif", an 1880 short story by French writer Guy de Maupassant sometimes translated as "Butterball"